Heather J Zar is a South African physician and scientist specialising in the care of children with respiratory diseases like asthma, tuberculosis and pneumonia.

Career and impact
Professor Zar is the Chair of the Department of Paediatrics and Child Health at the University of Cape Town and also serves as the President of the Pan African Thoracic Society.

Her work on HIV/AIDS related lung disease has helped to change World Health Organization and national guidelines. Work on using low cost recycled plastic bottles as spacers, to help children more easily inhale aerosolized asthma medication, has garnered Zar global attention. Zar is one of the leaders of a study of about 1000 children that are being closely followed up over time to better understand and develop preventive strategies to address childhood lung disease and other ailments. 
She is a member of the Academy of Science of South Africa. Professor Zar has published over 200 scientific articles.

Awards and honors
 American Thoracic Society World Lung Health Award 2014
 L'Oréal-UNESCO For Women in Science Awards in 2018

References

External links
 

South African women scientists
Living people
University of the Witwatersrand alumni
South African paediatricians
Women pediatricians
Columbia University Vagelos College of Physicians and Surgeons alumni
University of Cape Town alumni
Academic staff of the University of Cape Town
L'Oréal-UNESCO Awards for Women in Science laureates
Year of birth missing (living people)
Members of the Academy of Science of South Africa